The World Figure Skating Championships is an annual figure skating competition sanctioned by the International Skating Union in which figure skaters compete for the title of World Champion.

The 1956 competitions for men, ladies, pair skating, and ice dancing took place from February 16 to 19 in Garmisch-Partenkirchen, West Germany.

Results

Men

Judges:
 S. R. Croll 
 Ralph S. McCreath 
 K. Beyer 
 Mollie Phillips 
 Gérard Rodrigues-Henriques 
 H. Deistler 
 E. Finsterwald 
 B. Srbová 
 H. K. Kelley

Ladies

Judges:
 Ralph S. McCreath 
 P. Gross 
 Pamela Davis 
 Gérard Rodrigues-Henriques 
 Ercole Cattaneo 
 E. Labin 
 E. Finsterwald 
 B. Srbová 
 O. Dallmayr

Pairs

Judges:
 S. R. Croll 
 Ralph S. McCreath 
 K. Beyer 
 P. L. Barrajo 
 Ercole Cattaneo 
 F. Wojtanowskyj 
 E. Finsterwald 
 B. Srbová 
 O. Dallmayr

Ice dancing

Judges:
 Hermann Schiechtl 
 D. Ward 
 Henri Meudec 
 P. Farinet 
 F. Wojtanowskyj 
 A. Jobin 
 H. Kendall Kelley

Sources
 Result List provided by the ISU

World Figure Skating Championships
World Figure Skating Championships
World Figure Skating Championships
International figure skating competitions hosted by West Germany
Sports competitions in Bavaria
February 1956 sports events in Europe
Sport in Garmisch-Partenkirchen
1950s in Bavaria